The John Payson Williston Observatory is an astronomical observatory located at the highest point on the Mount Holyoke College campus. Constructed in 1881, the observatory is a modest building with a 24-inch Ritchey-Chretien reflector optical telescope. It is maintained and operated by the Mount Holyoke College Astronomy Department.

See also
 List of astronomical observatories

References

External links
 Williston Observatory
 Mount Holyoke College Astronomy Department

Astronomical observatories in Massachusetts
Buildings and structures in Hampshire County, Massachusetts
Mount Holyoke College
South Hadley, Massachusetts
1881 establishments in Massachusetts